KIBQ (105.9 FM) is a radio station licensed to serve the community of Austwell, Texas. The station is owned by Rufus Resources, LLC, and airs a classic country format as part of a group of stations branded as the "No Bull Radio Network".

The station was assigned the KIBQ call letters by the Federal Communications Commission on January 20, 2017.

References

External links
 Official Website
 FCC Public Information File for KIBQ
 

IBQ
Radio stations established in 2019
2019 establishments in Texas
Classic country radio stations in the United States
Refugio County, Texas